Natural frequency, also known as eigenfrequency, is the frequency at which a system tends to oscillate in the absence of any driving force.

The motion pattern of a system oscillating at its natural frequency is called the normal mode (if all parts of the system move sinusoidally with that same frequency).

If the oscillating system is driven by an external force at the frequency at which the amplitude of its motion is greatest (close to a natural frequency of the system), this frequency is called resonant frequency.

Overview
Free vibrations of an elastic body are called natural vibrations and occur at a frequency called the natural frequency. Natural vibrations are different from forced vibrations which happen at the frequency of an applied force (forced frequency). If the forced frequency is equal to the natural frequency, the vibrations' amplitude increases manyfold. This phenomenon is known as resonance.

In analysis of systems, it is convenient to use the angular frequency  rather than the frequency f, or the complex frequency domain parameter .

In a mass–spring system, with mass m and spring stiffness k, the natural angular frequency can be calculated as:

Natural frequencies depend on network topology and element values but not their input. It can be shown that the set of natural frequencies in a network can be obtained by calculating the poles of all impedance and admittance functions of the network. A pole of the network transfer function is associated with a natural angular frequencies of the corresponding response variable; however there may exist some natural angular frequency that does not correspond to a pole of the network function. These happen at some special initial states.

In LC and RLC circuits, its natural angular frequency can be calculated as:

See also
 Fundamental frequency

Footnotes

References
 
 
 
 

Waves
Oscillation